Cheiroseiulus is a genus of mites in the family Ascidae.

Species
 Cheiroseiulus crassipes Ahmed-Ramadan, 1998      
 Cheiroseiulus longisetosus Ahmed-Ramadan, 1998      
 Cheiroseiulus punctum Ahmed-Ramadan, 1998      
 Cheiroseiulus reniformis G. O. Evans & A. S. Baker, 1991      
 Cheiroseiulus spinosus Ahmed-Ramadan, 1998

References

Ascidae